Kunturmarka (Quechua kuntur condor, marka village / storey, Hispanicized spelling Condormarca) is an archaeological site in Peru. It is situated in the Ayacucho Region, Huanta Province, Huamanguilla District.

References

Archaeological sites in Ayacucho Region
Archaeological sites in Peru